The Laboratory Cabin Module (LCM) is a modular component of the Tiangong space station. Based on the Tiangong-2 experimental space module, the LCMs complete the third and final stage of Project 921, the CNSA's program to establish a permanent Chinese space station. While China's small unmanned spacecraft can provide platforms for zero gravity and exposure to space for scientific research, the LCMs offer a long term environment combined with ready access by human researchers over periods that far exceed the capabilities of Shenzhou spacecraft. Operations will be controlled from the Beijing Aerospace Command and Control Center in China.

The first LCM Wentian was launched into orbit on 24 July 2022. The second LCM Mengtian was launched into orbit on 31 October 2022.

Purpose

The first laboratory module provides additional navigation avionics, propulsion and orientation control as backup functions for the Tianhe Core Module (TCM). Both LCMs provide a pressurized environment for researchers to conduct science experiments in freefall or zero gravity which could not be conducted on Earth for more than a few minutes. Experiments can also be placed on the outside of the modules, for exposure to the space environment, cosmic rays, vacuum, and solar winds.

The axial port of the LCMs is fitted with rendezvous equipment and will first dock to the axial port of the CCM. A mechanical arm dubbed, as Indexing robotic arm, looking a sort of Lyappa arm used on the Mir space station moves Wentian to Starboard-side and Mengtian module to a portside port of the CCM. It is different from Lyappa as it works on a different mechanism. Lyappa arm is needed to control the pitch of the spacecraft and redocking in a different plane. But the indexing robot arm is used when docking is needed in the same plane. In addition to this arm used for docking relocation, the Chinarm on Tianhe module can also be used as a backup in place of Indexing robot arm. 

Wentian was successfully relocated to the starboard port on 30 September 2022 at 04:44 UTC by indexing robot arm.

It is used for manipulating extravehicular payloads and their positioning accuracy is 5 times better than the Chinarm. There are standard adaptors (silver squares) on the modules to host the payloads. There is also an adapter by which one of these arms can be grappled by the Chinarm it to work a single robotic arm like Orbiter Servicing Arm with Canadarms.

Mengtian also carries a toolbox equipped with a dexterous robotic arm, installed to assist in cargo transfer and payload release, that can be used to launch microsatellites, and an augmented-reality smart glass to assist astronauts with maintenance.

Electrical power is provided by two steerable solar power arrays, which use photovoltaic cells to convert sunlight into electricity. Energy is stored to power the station when it passes into the Earth's shadow. Resupply ships will replenish fuel for LCM 1 for station-keeping, to counter the effects of atmospheric drag.

Dimensions
The length of each module is 17.9 m. They are cylindrical with a maximum diameter of 4.2 m and an on-orbit mass of approximately  apiece.

Launch
Both modules are launched in 2022 on Long March 5B launch vehicles from Wenchang Satellite Launch Center. Wentian was launched on 24 July 2022, while Mengtian was launched on 31 October 2022.

See also
 Tianhe core module

References

External links
 Chinese Space Agency website

Chinese space stations
Spacecraft launched in 2022
2022 in China